The Sachrang Formation or "Posidonienschiefer" Formation (Whose Vulgar name is "Posidonia Shale") is a geological formation of southwestern Germany, northern Switzerland, northwestern Austria, southeast Luxembourg and the Netherlands, that spans about 3 million years during the Early Jurassic period (early Toarcian stage). It is known for its detailed fossils, especially sea fauna, listed below. Composed mostly by black shale, the formation is a Lagerstätte, where fossils show exceptional preservation (Including exquisite soft tissues), with a thickness that varies from about 1 m to about 40 m on the Rhine level, being on the main quarry at Holzmaden between 5 and 14 m. Some of the preserved material has been transformed into fossil hydrocarbon Jet, specially wood remains, used for jewelry. The exceptional preservation seen on the Posidonia Shale has been studied since the late 1800s, finding that a cocktail of chemical and environmental factors let to such an impressive conservation of the marine fauna. The most common theory is the changes in the oxygen level, where the different anoxic events of the Toarcian left oxygen-depleted bottom waters, with the biota dying and falling to the bottom without any predator able to eat the dead bodies.

Biological interaction frozen in time
Several animal behaviours have been recovered on the Posidonia Shale. The Monotis-Dactylioceras bed is one of them, as it shows an accumulation of the bivalves Meleagrinella substriata and the ammonite Dactylioceras, that were the most abundant representatives of its group on the Altdorf region, and were probably washed to near epicontinental waters by a rapid event, or as result of a large succession of events. This assemblage has been compared with modern Brazilian coastal Mangroves and also linked to Tsunami events.
Related to the Ammonite fauna, on Holzmaden there have been found several empty shells of this cephalopods, with associated crustaceans inside. The original specimen was reported in 1995 and consisted on a possible member of the genus Paleastacus inside a chamber of a Harpoceras. Other epizoans are found related to the decayed Ammonite shells, such as Serpulid Annelids and Bivalves, creating what was denominated as "benthic islands" as reference at be isolated benthic units that attracted fauna. The Decapod is related to the family Erymidae, that are considered as possible bottom-dweller carnivorous or carrion feeders. The associated fossil has several spherical structures that had been interpreted as decapod coprolites, implying that the animal lived for a long period on the shell, and maybe changes on the bottom oxygen stopped the process. More recent studies had recovered new data about the inquilinism of decapods inside ammonites, this time, however, recovering three Eryonoidea lobsters together within a body chamber. The lobsters most likely used the ammonoid as some kind of shelter, where was excluded the possibility of transportation into the body chamber by bottom currents. There are several theories about the gregarious inquilinism showed by this specimens, such as that the shell was and ideal location to molt, as has not been proved to be corpses or molts; that the shell provided protection against predators; the decomposing soft body of the ammonoid was a source of food that attracted the decapods or that was used as a long-term shelter. One key aspect found was that the muddy bottom was not suitable for burrowing, implying that the decapods look for a different shelter due to being unable to make their own.
Beyond trace fossils, several vertebrate specimens show associations with crustacean exoskeletal remains such as GPIT-PV-31586 and SMNS 58389 (Pachycormus macropterus) with necrophagous interaction as well SMNS 55934 (Stenopterygius quadriscissus) or SMNS 95401 (Metopacanthus sp.).

The genus Clarkeiteuthis and its predatory behaviour, found associated with fishes of the genus Leptolepis. Based on the position of prey and predator, was suggested that the coeloid cephalopods caught and killed the fishes while the schools still in well-oxygenated waters and then descended into oxygen-depleted water layers where the cephalopod suffocated and died attached to its prey. The fish measured , while the coeloid 21 and it was measured by the fossilized arms of 14 specimens of coeloids that the hunting specimens arms where contracted over the fish, probably quickly killing it by cutting its spine.
Several Geotheutis have been reported with eumelanin preserved along with its ink sacs.
A specimen of Jeletzkyteuthis found on Ohmden has appeared predating a Parabelopeltis. The association of this 2 genera shows the predatory behaviour of this group when lived on Epicontinental seas, being rather different than extant Vampyromorphs.
A Pabulite (fossilized meal when it never entered the digestive tract) was recovered on Holzmaden, being composed by an associated Passaloteuthis laevigata with its arms embracing an exuvia of a crustacean. The own Belemnnite can be the remnant of a failed prey of a Hybodus, corroborating a possible tropic chain.

One of the most complex organism interactions on the Posidonia Shale where the crinoid megarafts, that group a wide variety of animals, creating large floating ecosystems, being the longest surviving communities to exist in the fossil record. The largest megaraft found measured , and is based on an Agathoxylon trunk, where different animals were attached. The presence of this megarafts was in part possible due to the absence of marine wood worms, that destroy tree logs on less than 3 years along without the presence of modern raft wood predators (that appeared on the Bathonian) those rafts can last up to 5 years, being that the main reason the crinoids attached were able to reach huge sizes. Probably where also essential to distribute animals along the sea basins. Seirocrinus & Pentacrinites where various of the main crinoid colonizers of the floating rafts. Seirocrinus is the main representative of the pelagic crinoids, being among the tallest animals know, with a size of 26 m the largest documented specimen. The ecology of the genus is widely known, where is known that the smallest stems were among the first animals to colonize the rafts, with at least 2 generations of crinoids found per raft, where the hydrodynamic changes of the log influenced the settlement of the crinoids. It is believed that Seridocrinus had a seasonal reproduction, linked to the monsoonal conditions that sent new logs to the sea. The large crinoids would have feed on pelagic micronutrients, and afer fall on the bottom, all the colony would have died.
Thoracic cirripedes of the genus Toarcolepas became the oldest epiplanktonic cirripede known on the fossil record, probably motivated by the appearance of the giant crinoid rafts. It has been found in situ associated with fossil wood.

The shark Hybodus includes specimens with the gastric contents, being full of belemnnite fragments. That implied active predatory behaviour by the genus of several kinds of belemnnites, such as Youngibelus.
A Spienballen, a regurgitated mass composed of indigestible stomach contents had been found on the Holzmaden quarry. The Speinballen measures 285 mm length with a diameter of 160 mm, and consists of 4 members of the genus Dapedium (Dapediidae) and a jaw identified as Lepidotes (Semionotidae). The animals capable of it had been suggested as sharks like Hybodus, actinopterygians and several marine reptiles. Hybodus, being was able to reach nearly 3 meters long and with a dentition suitable to hunt fish, although its stomach contents suggest it is a mostly invertebrate hunter. Actinopterygians like Saurostomus grew up to 2 m long, and have been found with fishes, coeloids and ammonites in its stomach contents, however, not the fishes present on this Spienballen. Marine reptiles included marine crocodiles, such as Platysuchus or Pelagosaurus, associated to the fishes of the Speinballen, although are proven to have eaten gastroliths to improve buoyancy and digestion. Ichthyosaurs, whose diet is among the best studied of the Posidonia Shale, with Dapedium specimens in juvenile stomachs, along with coeloids. Plesiosaurs were desacredited due to the study of its teeth, that proves a diet based on soft-body prey, such as fishes of the genus Leptolepis and coeloids. Dapedium and Lepidotes, with a heavy and solid squamation can be excluded.
A specimen of Pachycormus  has been found with stomach contents that include hooks similar to the ones found on genera like Clarkeiteuthis.
SMNS 51144 (Saurostomus esocinus) was found with Chondrites isp. burrows in the abdominal cavit, what indicates a possible opportunistic scavenger. Other Chondrites isp. includes SMNS 17500 and MHH 1981/25 (Stenopterygius uniter) that can either suggest ichthyosaurs were preserved immediately below one such bioturbation horizon or scavenger association.

One of the most emblematic finds of the formation its that of a mother Stenopterygius giving birth living young, like the modern dolphins and marine mammals, being born with the tails first. Other specimens have been found with Embryos inside, but with the bones of them scattered, partly beyond the body limits of the mother. There have been various theories about this scenario: the bones of embryos had been deposited before the body of the adult went to the sea floor, covering the embryo bones and implying that the adult would not be the mother of the embryos. Another option is that a pregnant ichthyosaur on its last moments sank to the bottom and may have struggled for life, given untimely birth to some of the foetuses. Other option follows the presence of foetus bones outside the mother body, where a dead female sank to the bottom, with the water warm enough, helping the putrefaction gases to start to develop while the hydrostatic pressure was too high to be prevented by the body. Scavengers must have started eating from the dead body, until the chamber retaining the pressure was to thin and exploded. These theories where however contested after the study, where it was criticised the absence of the presence of the bottom-current activity in the epicontinental sea covering Central Europe during the Toarcian, pointing that the mother carcass should have been translated after it sank to the bottom floor, probably exploding or expelling its embryos first, that would be transported along.
Specimen SMNS 53363 (Eurhinosaurus?) from Aichelberg was found with two encrusted large oysters (Liostrea) on the right pterygoid, considered to be part of a reef stage over bones.
SMNS 80234 (Stenopterygius quadriscissus) represents another female with embryos, yet also shows ribs broken perimortem that can be either of  intraspecific aggression or a predation attempt. This specimen has several taxa associated: ammonite aptychi and two ophiuroids (Sinosura brodiei) and a articulated echinoid (Diademopsis crinifera), indicating a short-lived deadfall community.
SMNS 81841 (Stenopterygius quadriscissus) represents one of the most clear examples of deadfall communities described in the formation: the skeleton is associated with serpulids surrounded by a mass of disarticulated ophiuroid remains, indeterminate echinoid tests, an isolated crinoid ossicle,  the byssate bivalve Oxytoma inaequivalvis,  the pectinid Propeamussium pumilus, Eopecten strionatis, Plagiostoma sp. , Meleagrinella sp., "Cucullaea" muensteri, with the genera Parainoceramya dubia and Liostrea associated with the carcass. As many of this bivalves shown overgrowth likely the community persisted for some time. Fossil traces of Gastrochaenolites isp. attributed to mechanical bivalve borers are abundant implicating prolonged exposure of the skeleton on the seafloor.
SMNS 81719 (Stenopterygius uniter) includes Liostrea, Propeamussium pumilus, Plagiostoma sp. and Parainoceramya dubia, with other invertebrates found (?) not being part of the deadfall community, such as several ammonites and Parainoceramya valves stratigraphically below the specimen. This specimen includes also traces of scavenging activity, possibly by crustaceans.
SMNS 80113, (Stenopterygius triscissus) was found populated by Parainoceramya, a specimen of Eopecten strionatis and an unexpected specimen of the small infaunal lucinid Mesomiltha pumila,  equivocal evidence for the sulfophilic stage.
Local ichthyosaur soft tissues include skin enough well preserved to infer coloration and appearance on the living animal, as well evidence for homeothermy and crypsis.

Microbial activity

Cyanobacteria

Rhizaria

Foraminifera

Dinoflagellata

Dinoflagellate cysts 
The evolutionary burst of the Toarcian Dinoflajellates led the first appearance and rapid radiation of the Phallocystaceae (Susainium, Parvocysta, Phallocysta, Moesiodinium and related forms). This occurred at the time of a widespread Lower Toarcian bituminous anoxia-derived shale of the Posidonienschiefer Formation. Is recovered on  the Posidonienschiefer, Pozzale, Italy, Asturias, Spain, Bornholm, Denmark, the Lusitanian Basin of Portugal, the Jet Rock Formation in Yorkshire and to the "Schistes Carton" in northern France. Whether there is a causal connection in this co-occurrence of Phallocystaceae and bituminous facies is a problem still to be resolved. This family has its acme in diversity and quantity in the latest Toarcian and became less important in the Aalenian.

Algae 
Includes abundant variety of algae, such as the genus of colonial Green algae Botryococcus, or the unicellular algal bodies Tasmanites, and other small examples. Algae are a good reference for changes on the oxygen conditions along the Toarcian.

Algae Acritarchs

Haptophyta

Chlorophyta

Fungi 
Fungal Spores, hypae and undeterminated remains are a rare element of the otherwise openmarine deposits of the Posidonienschiefer formation, but where recovered at Dormettingen. This fungal remains are composed mostly by indeterminate spores and indicate oxygenated environments and suitable transportation by rivers.

Incertade Sedis

Plantae 

The macroflora of the Posidonia slate can be described as extremely poor in species. Apart from the remains of Horsetails, it is without exception the remains of coarse branches and fronds from gymnosperms, in which one has a certain can assume transport resistance. Remains of Ferns are completely missing, except for tall arboreal ferns (Peltaspermales). Mostly of the flora was reported from the area of Braunschweig. The major explanation for the flora could be that the plants in question are mono-or oligotypic stands on the edge of the waters that flow into the Posidonienschiefer sea, probably tear away in the course of flood events, easily fragmented during transport and wave waves, possibly especially in the occasional storm events postulated.  In terms of taphonomy, this would result in a comparison with today's reed Phragmites, which can form extensive stocks on the edge of shallower and slowly flowing waters ("Reed belts"). The Wood remnants clearly indicate one higher diversity of Coniferous flora in the delivery area than the remains of leafy branches. This fact is likely to be proportionate, similar to that frequent occurrence of charcoalized or gagged trunks, mostly of them are believed to be "driftwoods" that only take a long time drifting also suggests a frequent settlement with mussels and full-grown Sea Lilies. The deposition settings are at large distance from the nearest coastline (for southern Germany about 100 kilometers), making only plants strong to transportation able to resist enough to get deposited. At Irlbach and Kheleim, NE of Regensburg, where the Posidonienschiefer has its near mainland deposit with abundant sand, a rich deposit filled with plant remains of different kind (Seds, Reproductive organs, Leafs, Stems, Cuticles and wood) with traces of coal was recovered, however, it was never studied in depth. Of all the plant material expected only a few Bennetites leafs and two conifer branches with leaves where cited and none studied.
At the Austrian realm The sachrang Member was developed in the basinal area, while the Unken Member, sandwiched between red, often condensed limestones, represents the marginal facies. Due to be more marginal and connected with the southern Vindelician land, the most diverse palynological assemblages of the formation are found, transported from zonas with moldanuvian granites as proven by the feldspar accumulations.

Phytoclasts
Phytoclasts have been recovered from several sections on the formation, but only studied in depth from the Dotternhausen and specially Dormettingen. Here two kinds of Phytoclasts where recovered, opaque phytoclasts (charcoal, indicator of wildfire activity on nearby landmasses, indicator of seasonal alterations of the water column) and translucent phytoclasts (indicator of proximal landmasses with high availability of wood and other plant material, as well transport conditions). On the lowermost part of the section opaque phytoclasts are low (15% of the total organic matter) while tranlucent are incredibily abundant (40%), lowering its abundance to a 20-10% on the next section. The Exaratum Subzone is the only one with an inverse trend and more abundance of opaque phytoclasts. On the Bifrons level, both types reach between a 15% and a 30%, showing a rapid increase, to decrease on the end of the section to values of less than 10%. Opaque Phytoclasts, for a supposed marine deposit are relatively abundant on some sections, whose decreasing on others suggest (along with increasing levels of Kaolinite) an increased delivery of land plant material by rivers, from areas with wetter climate and less frequent fires, while its rise suggest the opposite, nearby continental setting with dry climate and continuous wildfire activity.

Palynology

Equisetaceae

Pteridospermatophyta

Bennettitales

Ginkgoales

Pinophyta

Fossil wood 
Fossil Wood increases on the marginal Unken Member, with great amounts of logs and fragments of more than 1 m. Surface studies suggest relationships with the wood genera identified on the coeval Úrkút Manganese Ore Formation.

Ichnofossils
The major ichnological analyses of the Posidonian Shale come from Dotternhausen/Dormettingen, where the ichnogenus Phymatoderma formed the so-called Tafelfleins and Seegrasschiefer. The Tafelflein bed was deposited under anoxic bottom and pore water, where a recover of oxygen allow the Phymatoderma-producers return. The two organic-rich layers (Tafelfleins and Seegrasschiefer) are characterized by the dense occurrence of trace fossils such as Chondrites and Phymatoderma, done episodically due to the fall of the oxygen levels. The Coeval more nearshore Swiss deposits referred Posidonian Shale (Rietheim Member) hosted similar trace fossils asthose recovered on SW Germany. Tougth this setting apparently evolved faster to more oxic-to-dysoxic bottom waters.
At Unken, laminated deposits of red limestone suggest well oxygenated active waters (as lack shale), where high amounts of Chondrites are found.

Invertebrata

Porifera
In the non-bituminous facies located on Obereggenen im Breisgau (Shore of the Black Forest High), especially the lower semicelatum subzone, pyritized individual needles of silica sponges (Demospongiae and Hexactinellida) are found, rarely on pelagic layers to very often on the low depth marine deposits. They are usually associated with radiolarian stone cores. In Dusslingen and Reutlingen, these sponge needles could be barytized in phosphorites of the Haskerense subzone and are much more common here than in any other zone of  the Lower Toarcian. These needles are absent in the bituminous horizons of the entire Lower Toarcian.
Increased amounts of Sponge needles (dominated by Hexactinellida) are also found on the arenaceous facies of the nearshore unit that is the Unken member, being the only section if its region hosts them, probably due to be an active and well oxygenated bottom. The location of this member as a possible bay on the south of the vindelician land probably allow to the development of more pre-Toarcian AOE conditions, hence the presence of biota otherwise rare on bituminous layers.

Annelida

Mollusca

Brachiopoda

Bivalvia

Gastropoda

Cephalopoda

Arthropoda

Cycloidea

Ostracoda

Malacostraca

Thoracica

Arachnida

Insecta
Insects are a common terrestrial animals that were probably washed into the sea due to monsoon conditions present on the Sachrang Formation.

Echinodermata 
Echinoderm debris is pretty abundant on the shale-free Unken and Salzburg members, including  Crinoid skeleton elements, also that of the Ophiurida; the Echinoids take their place, where really blossomed at that time. That's why Pedicellaria are observed very often.

Asterozoa

Echinoidea

Holothuroidea

Crinoidea

Vertebrata

Fishes

Chondrichthyes

Actinopterygii

Sarcopterygii

Amniota

Ichthyosauria 
Inderminate specimens are known.

Plesiosauria

Sphenodontia

Testudinata

Crocodylomorpha

Pterosauria

Saurischia

References

External links 
 Images of fossils in the Urwelt-Museum Hauff (Holzmaden)

 
Jurassic Germany
 
Posidonia